Vianney Marlen Trejo Delgadillo (born 2 August 1994) is a Mexican Paralympic swimmer who competes in international level events. She was born with a right arm malformation and underdeveloped legs.

References

1994 births
Living people
Swimmers from Mexico City
Paralympic swimmers of Mexico
Mexican female backstroke swimmers
Mexican female butterfly swimmers
Mexican female freestyle swimmers
Mexican female medley swimmers
Swimmers at the 2012 Summer Paralympics
Swimmers at the 2016 Summer Paralympics
Medalists at the World Para Swimming Championships
Medalists at the 2011 Parapan American Games
Medalists at the 2015 Parapan American Games
Medalists at the 2019 Parapan American Games
S6-classified Paralympic swimmers
21st-century Mexican women
20th-century Mexican women